Bob Warming is an American soccer coach is currently a technical advisor for Union Omaha in USL League One. A veteran college soccer coach, Warming has coached eight other men's college soccer programs across the United States, including Penn State University, his previous coaching stint, and Creighton University, on two separate stints. Additionally, Warming has coached at Old Dominion University and University of North Carolina at Charlotte, both NCAA Division I institions. 

Warming ranks 15th in NCAA Division I History with 376 career wins throughout 32 seasons. He is one of only two coaches in NCAA Division I history to take two different schools to the College Cup. His teams at Creighton reached the NCAA tournament in all but his final season at the helm. His 2008 team featured a 15 match unbeaten streak, and an elite eight appearance in the NCAA tournament. He is a member of the Omaha Sports Hall of Fame.

Career

Coaching 
Warming began his coaching career at Transylvania University in Kentucky for one season. He then coached at Berry College in Georgia, where he earned three coach of the year awards. Under his watch, Berry went 61–22–2 in 3 years. At Saint Louis, his team advanced to the 1997 NCAA Final Four, and won three Conference USA regular season titles, as well as two Conference USA tournament titles. He graduated from Berea College in 1975, where he posted a 28–2–2 record as a starting goalkeeper.

He also coached Creighton from 1990 to 1994. His cumulative record at Creighton is 183–57–29. His home field record was 102–16–14, and his Missouri Valley Conference record was 60–13–7. He has led his teams to seven Missouri Valley Conference regular season titles, severn Missouri Valley Conference tournament titles, and eleven NCAA tournament appearances. From 1997 to 2001, he coached at Saint Louis University. 

In 2010, Warming was hired to take the vacant head coaching position at Penn State University. At the end of the 2017 NCAA Division I men's soccer season, Warming announced his retirement from coaching.

On April 2, 2018, Warming came out of retirement, and was named head coach of the Omaha Maverick men's soccer team, replacing Jay Mims. Warming became the second head men's soccer coach in Omaha history.

Warming joined the coaching staff of USL League One club Union Omaha on July 29, 2022, as a technical advisor.

References

External links
 Omaha profile

Year of birth missing (living people)
Place of birth missing (living people)
Living people
Berea College alumni
Charlotte 49ers men's soccer coaches
Creighton Bluejays men's soccer coaches
Furman Paladins athletic directors
Omaha Mavericks men's soccer coaches
Old Dominion Monarchs men's soccer coaches
Penn State Nittany Lions men's soccer coaches
Saint Louis Billikens men's soccer coaches
American soccer coaches